William Bonemer Júnior, known professionally as William Bonner (born 16 November 1963), is a Brazilian newscaster, publicist and journalist. He is the current editor-in-chief and anchorman of Jornal Nacional, the most-watched Brazilian news program, aired by TV Globo.

Biography
Bonner graduated in Mass Communications with an emphasis in Advertising and Publicity from the School of Arts and Communication, University of São Paulo (ECA-USP) and began his professional career in advertising in 1983.

In 1985, he started working at Radio USPFM and was eventually hired as announcer and television host on TV Bandeirantes until June 1986. He then moved to Rede Globo, assigned as editor and presenter of SPTV, a São Paulo local news program and, later, host of Fantástico.

Upon moving to Rio the following year, he was the main newscaster of Jornal da Globo between 1989 and 1992 alongside Fátima Bernardes and, between 1994 and 1996, editor-in-chief and newscaster of Jornal Hoje.

Since April 1996, after Cid Moreira and Sergio Chapelin left their positions, Bonner became lead anchor and, later, editor-in-chief of Jornal Nacional, Globo's main weekly news program, alongside Fátima Bernardes, Patrícia Poeta and, currently, Renata Vasconcellos.

Personal life
Bonner met Fátima Bernardes when they were the main newscasters of SPTV in 1986; they married in 1990 and gave birth to triplets Beatriz, Laura, and Vinicius in 1997. They announced their separation on August 29, 2016, via Twitter. In September 2018, he married his then-girlfriend Natasha Dantas, a physical therapist. The couple lives in Rio de Janeiro.

In 2009, Bonner released a book, Jornal Nacional: Modo de Fazer, a tribute to the 40 years of the Jornal Nacional, where he reveals the making of the show.

News programs
 SPTV (1986-1989);
 Fantástico (1988-1990);
 Jornal da Globo (1989-1993);
 Jornal Hoje (1993-1996);
 Jornal Nacional (since 1996)

Stand-in presenter
 Jornal Nacional (1988-1996)

References

External links

1963 births
Living people
Brazilian people of Arab descent
Brazilian television news anchors
University of São Paulo alumni
Shorty Award winners